I Can See Your Voice (abbreviated ICSYV) is an international television music game show franchise that originated in South Korea.

"I Can See Your Voice" may also refer to:

Local adaptations with a similar title

Notes
</noinclude>